Laha is an Austronesian language spoken on Ambon Island in eastern Indonesia.

References

Central Maluku languages
Languages of the Maluku Islands